Chengapalli is a biggest landmark located in between Salem to Coimbatore Highway (NH 544) Tirupur district, Tamil Nadu, India.
It has the status of a panchayat town in Tamil Nadu. It is famous for textiles. Almost 5000 peoples coming from other areas for their employments. It is having four way and six way roads. 

It lies on the Salem-Coimbatore National Highway 544 (formerly NH 47).

Places of Worship  
Arulmigu Azhagunachi Amman Temple.
 Seraikannimar Temple.
soleeswarar Temple.
Sengal Vinayakar Temple.
Sethu Mariyamman Temple and more Than 16 Karupparayan temples around Chengapalli

Neighborhoods

 Vijayamangalam
 Perumanallur
 Tiruppur
 Uthukuli
 Perundurai
 Avinashi
 Gobichettipaalayam
 Kanchikoil
 Kunnathur
 Thingalur
 Ingur
 Chennimalai
 Kavundapadi
 Bhavani
 Komarapalayam
 Thirumuruganpoondi

Transport 

The nearest airport is the Coimbatore International Airport, which is about 50 km away from Chengapalli.

There is no rail transport to the town. The nearest Railway Station is at Tirupur, which is about 15 km away from Chengapalli.

The key public mass transport for the people here is the Buses run by the State Government & Private Sector thus providing a competitive service to the people.

Chengapalli's geographical location enables it to be a regional hub for many long distance travellers to and from the twin cities Coimbatore and Tirupur.

References 

Villages in Tiruppur district